Stéphane Bortzmeyer is a French engineer specialised in computer networks.

Biography 
He has worked mostly on DNS security.

He is a member of Gitoyen and of the Board of France-IX, the main exchange for the Internet in France.

As a member of IETF, he authored several Request for Comments, most notably on DNS and privacy.

He contributes to the website anti-rev.org, which fights against Revisionism in France.

Bibliography

See also 

 Afnic

References

External links 

 Official blog 

 Articles by Stéphane Bortzmeyer on RIPE.net 

French Wikimedians
Telecommunications engineers
Pages with unreviewed translations
Year of birth missing (living people)
Living people